Sikkim Lok Sabha constituency is a Lok Sabha (lower house of the Indian parliament) constituency which covers the entire area of the state of Sikkim.

Sikkim participated in its first general elections in 1977 after joining the Union in 1975. Its first member of parliament (MP) was Chatra Bahadur Chhetri of the Indian National Congress who was elected unopposed. The current MP is Indra Hang Subba, who has represented the constituency since 2019. His term is expected to end in May 2024.

Assembly Segments

Members of Parliament

Election results

20th century

General election 1977
In the first election after Sikkim joined the Union, Indian National Congress candidate, Chhatra Bahadur Chhetri was elected unopposed.

General election 1980

General election 1984

General election 1989

General election 1991

General election 1996

General election 1998

General election 1999

21st century

General election 2004

General election 2009

General election 2014

General election 2019

See also
List of constituencies of the Lok Sabha

References

External links
Sikkim lok sabha constituency election 2019 date and schedule

Constituencies of the Lok Sabha
Lok Sabha
1977 establishments in Sikkim
Constituencies established in 1977
Elections in Sikkim